Janis Brenner is an American dancer, choreographer, singer, and Artistic Director of Janis Brenner & Dancers in New York City.

Biography 
Brenner has toured in 36 countries as a "singular performer"  with a multifaceted artistic range.  Honors and grants include: A New York Dance & Performance Award ("Bessie") for her performance in Meredith Monk’s "The Politics of Quiet", Lester Horton Award for Choreography in L.A., NY Foundation for the Arts Fellowship, The Fund for US Artists at International Festivals, the U.S. State Department, Asian Cultural Council, The Trust for Mutual Understanding, UNESCO, US Embassies in Moscow, Jakarta and Dakar, and a commission for the interdisciplinary work, "The Memory Project", from the Whitney Museum of American Art at Philip Morris.

Brenner performed with Meredith Monk and Vocal Ensemble from 1990 - 2005 (recording on ECM Records) and continues to perform several of Monk's solo works.  She received her MFA degree in Dance from the Hollins University/ADF graduate program in 2009. She is currently at the faculty of The Juilliard School serving as Choreographic Mentor to the Choreographers & Composers course and teaching Creative Process. Brenner was on the Board of The Gender Project in NY, which seeks to empower women in dance, and is on the Advisory Board of The Yard in Chilmark, MA. In May 2006, Janis was inducted into the Farmingdale High School "Wall of Fame" on Long Island as an honored alumna.

Choreography 
 Anima (1981)
Primadonna (1981)
Guilt (1985) 
Still There (1987)   
Suspicions (1987)  
Pieces of Trust (1989)  
Anticipation (1989)   
The Shekhinah/Voices (1989)  
Non Sinatra Songs (1991)  
Pieces of Trust (duet version) (1991)  
Layers (1992)    
Ton of Led (1994)  
Shun-Woa (Original title: Uzu Maki) (1994/2007)  
A Matter of Time (1995)   
What About Bob (1996)   
Solo for Janis (created by Richard Siegal, 1997)  
On the Rim of Thought (1998)  
heartSTRINGS (1998)   
The L Word (2000)   
A Peace for Women (2000–2001)   
The Last Ones (2001)  
Common Ground (2001)   
Contents May Have Shifted... (2002)  
Lake (2004)  
Laugh...Cry (2004)  
The Sound of Moving (2006)  
Natashka's Tanze (2006) 
Room (2006)  
The Awkward Stage (2007)  
Lost, Found, Lost (2007) 
Paradise Songs (2008)  
The Memory Project (Ongoing) 
Dancing in Absentia (2009)

Awards 
 NY Dance and Performance Award (Bessie Award) for Outstanding Creative Achievement in Meredith Monk's work "The Politics of Quiet", 1997
 NY Dance and Performance Nomination (Bessie nomination) for her performance in "Solo for Janis" choreographed by Richard Siegal, 1999
 Lester Horton Award for Outstanding Achievement in Choreography in L.A. for the collaborative work "Tom's Renaissance", 1996
 Richard Porter Leach Fellowship for the Arts from SUNY Empire State College, 1993
 NY Dance On Camera Festival award, 1986

Collaborators 
Brenner has performed with Meredith Monk and the Vocal Ensemble since 1990 and performs a vocal suite from Monk's "Songs from the Hill" in concert. She and her composer/vocalist Theo Bleckmann recorded their work "Mars Cantata" available from Earrelevant Music. She was also a co-choreographer for Michael Moschen (1988-92: BAM's Next Wave Festival, US tours and PBS' Great Performances), a soloist with Annabelle Gamson's company performing historic repertory of Mary Wigman, Isadora Duncan, and others (1984–87), and a soloist with the Murray Louis Dance Company working with Rudolf Nureyev, Plácido Domingo, Dave Brubeck Quartet, Joseph Papp, Batsheva Dance Company in Israel and Alwin Nikolais (1977–84).

References

External links 
  Janis Brenner Juilliard Faculty Biography
  Janis Brenner & Dancers' Official Website

Living people
American choreographers
Artists from New York City
Year of birth missing (living people)